Sredinny Range (meaning Middle Range) is a mountain range on the Kamchatka Peninsula of Russia. It stretches from northeast to southwest along the center of the peninsula and is made up of volcanoes, mostly shield volcanoes and stratovolcanoes. The Sredinny Range is separated from the north–south running coastal Eastern Range (Vostochny) to the east, by the Central Kamchatka Depression.

The mountains are currently occupied by small mountain glaciers, contributing to Kamchatka's characterization as the most extensively glaciated region of northeastern Asia, with glaciers covering roughly 592 ± 20.4 km2.

References

Mountain ranges of Russia
Mountains of Kamchatka Krai